Loctudy is a fishing port and seaside resort in Brittany, France, at the mouth of the Pont-l'Abbé river estuary.

The commune is in the Finistère department in northwestern France. Situated on the peninsula of Penmarc'h in the far southwestern part of Lower Brittany, it preserves elements of old Breton culture, and the Breton language is still in use.

The name means "place or hermitage of St Tudy".  There is controversy concerning the identity of the saint: both Tudy of Landevennec and Tudwal have been suggested.  The eleventh-century church is dedicated to St Tudy.

The port grew because of its sheltered position protected from the prevailing southwest winds.  The fishing port is important (2004-6: around 7000 tonnes per annum landed), and specializes in langoustines, called "demoiselles de Loctudy".  The four ports of the Penmarc'h peninsula (Guilvinec, Saint Guénolé Penmarc'h, Loctudy and Lesconil) land 40 000 tonnes per year and constitute the largest fishery in France.  A marina was constructed in 1991 and had (2006) 661 moorings.

Loctudy is  twinned with the towns of Fishguard in Pembrokeshire, Wales and Ribadeo in Galicia, Spain.

Population
Inhabitants of Loctudy are called Loctudistes.

Irish cyclist, and yellow jersey holder of the three European Grand Tours, Shay Elliott, lived, and operated a hotel, here, for a period, with his Strasbourg-born wife, and son Pascal.

See also
Communes of the Finistère department

References

External links
Official website 

Mayors of Finistère Association 

Communes of Finistère
Seaside resorts in France